The Lincoln Prairie Conference or LPC, is a high school athletic conference in Central Illinois. The first year of existence was the 2019-20 school year. Its schools belong to the IHSA and compete in many sports and other activities.

History
The conference started in the 2019-20 school year and originally included Arcola, Argenta-Oreana, Arthur-Lovington-Atwood-Hammond, Bement, Blue Ridge, Cerro Gordo, Cumberland, Decatur LSA, Heritage, Kansas, Oakland, Okaw Valley, Sangamon Valley, Shiloh, and Villa Grove all who left the Little Okaw Valley Conference. The 15 member schools left the Little Okaw Valley Conference due to far travel time and left out Martinsville, Hutsonville, Palestine and Oblong. On December 13th, 2021 Sullivan High School accepted an invitation to join the Lincoln Prairie Conference beginning in the 2023-24 school year.

Member Schools

There are 15 member schools in the Conference.

Kansas, Oakland and Shiloh co-op to form the Tri-County Titans

Future Member

Membership timeline

See also
 List of Illinois High School Association member conferences

References

External links
 http://www.illinoishsglorydays.com
 http://www.ihsa.com

Illinois high school sports conferences